Billingsley is a civil parish in Shropshire, England.  It contains four listed buildings that are recorded in the National Heritage List for England.  Of these, one is listed at Grade II*, the middle of the three grades, and the others are at Grade II, the lowest grade.  The parish is almost completely rural, and the listed buildings consist of two farmhouses, a farm building, and a church.


Key

Buildings

References

Citations

Sources

Lists of buildings and structures in Shropshire